Ooni Aribiwoso was the 34th Ooni of Ife, a paramount traditional ruler of Ile Ife, the ancestral home of the Yorubas. He succeeded Ooni Lugbade and was succeeded by  
Ooni Osinlade.

References

Oonis of Ife
Yoruba history